Kathryn Pamela Hess (born 1967) is an American mathematician who has served as professor of mathematics at École Polytechnique Fédérale de Lausanne (EPFL) since 1999. She is known for her work on homotopy theory, category theory, and algebraic topology, both pure and applied. In particular, she applies the methods of algebraic topology to the study of neurology, cancer biology, and materials science. She is a fellow of the American Mathematical Society.

Life 
Kathryn Hess was born 21 September 1967 in Bryn Mawr, Pennsylvania. She began to accelerate in mathematics in 1979, thanks to the Mathematical Talent Development Project (MTDP) set up in Eau Claire, Wisconsin, by her parents, through the Association for High Potential Children, which they also founded. Both programs are currently defunct. Hess earned a BSc with honors in mathematics from the University of Wisconsin–Madison in 1985. Her dissertation was entitled  A Proof of Ganea's Conjecture for Rational Spaces.

Work 
Hess has worked and written extensively on topics in algebraic topology including homotopy theory, model categories and algebraic K-theory. She has also used the methods of algebraic topology and category theory to investigate homotopical generalizations of descent theory and Hopf–Galois extensions. In particular, she has studied generalizations of these structures for ring spectra and differential graded algebras.

She has more recently used algebraic topology to understand structures in neurology and materials science.

As of March 2022, she has been the principal academic advisor for 14 mathematics PhDs at EPFL, including 4 women.

Awards and honors 
In addition to her strong publication record, Hess has been widely recognized for her pedagogical abilities. She received the Agepoly prize for best teacher in the Basic Sciences Faculty in 2005, the Credit Suisse prize for best EPFL teacher in 2012, and the "Polysphere d'Or" Agepoly prize for best teacher at EPFL in 2013.

She was named an individual member of the Swiss Academy of Engineering Sciences in 2016 and a fellow of the American Mathematical Society for "contributions to homotopy theory, applications of topology to the analysis of biological data, and service to the mathematical community" in 2017. In 2017, she received an award as a distinguished speaker of the European Mathematical Society. She delivered one of the public lectures during the Eighth European Congress of Mathematics on 21 June 2021.

Selected publications

References

External links 
 Videos.
 Women Inspire Innovation: Kathryn Hess Bellwald, EPFL

Living people
Fellows of the American Mathematical Society
20th-century American mathematicians
21st-century American mathematicians
American women mathematicians
Topologists
Academic staff of the École Polytechnique Fédérale de Lausanne
Massachusetts Institute of Technology School of Science alumni
People from Bryn Mawr, Pennsylvania
Mathematicians from Pennsylvania
1967 births
20th-century women mathematicians
21st-century women mathematicians
University of Wisconsin–Madison College of Letters and Science alumni
20th-century American women
21st-century American women